The following is a list of Hungarian magazines.
 168 Óra
 Budapest Business Journal
 Cannabis Kultusz
 Company
 Diplomat
 Élet és Irodalom
 Ellenfény (culture)  
 Eszmélet
 Figyelő
 Funzine
 Galaktika
 Hetek
 Heti Válasz
 Heti Világgazdaság
 Infermental
 Kritika
 Literatura Mondo
 Magyar Demokrata
 Magyar Narancs
 Magyar Tudomány
 Mások
 Nők Lapja (women)
 Nyugat
 Reform
 Trade Magazine

See also
 Media of Hungary
 List of newspapers in Hungary

References

Magazines
 
Hungary